The Parliamentary Elections Corrupt Practices Act 1885 (48 & 49 Vict. c. 56) was an Act of the Parliament of the United Kingdom. It became law on 6 August 1885.

It declared, in order to clarify past ambiguities, that it was legal for an employer to allow his employees a reasonable amount of paid time off work in order to vote in a parliamentary election. This permission was, as far as reasonably possible, to be given to all employees, and not to be given in order to induce them to vote for a specific candidate, or refused to discourage them from voting for another.

It did not criminalise any previously legitimate activity.

See also
List of UK parliamentary election petitions

References
Oliver & Boyd's new Edinburgh almanac and national repository for the year 1886. Oliver & Boyd, Edinburgh, 1886

United Kingdom Acts of Parliament 1885
1885 in British law
Election legislation
Election law in the United Kingdom